Galeodea triganceae is a species of large sea snail, a marine gastropod mollusc in the family Cassidae, the helmet snails.

Shell description
The maximum shell height is 48 mm, and maximum width 31 mm.

Distribution
This species is endemic to New Zealand including the Chatham Islands.

Habitat
This helmet shell is found at depths of between 90 and 600 m.

References

triganceae
Gastropods described in 1953